Eastern Palestine may refer to:

A historic term for Transjordan (region), the part of the geographic Palestine region east of the Jordan river
The West Bank, a landlocked geographical area, located in Western Asia

See also 

East Palestine, Ohio